HMS Orontes was a 36-gun Scamander-class fifth rate frigate of the Royal Navy. She was built at Frindsbury as Brilliant, but was renamed in 1812. She was launched in 1813. Her first commander was Captain Nathaniel Day Cochrane, who served on the Irish Station. She was later under Captain William M’Culloch, who may have taken her to the West Indies.

On 31 January 1815 Lloyd's List reported that Orontes was one of the escorts of a fleet that had left St Thomas on 11 December 1814.

Orontes was broken up at Sheerness in April 1817.

Citations and references
Citations

References

Frigates of the Royal Navy
Orontes
1813 ships
Ships built on the River Medway